The 2017 Aircel Chennai Open was a 2017 ATP World Tour men's tennis tournament played on outdoor hard courts. It was the 22nd edition of the only ATP tournament taking place in India and took place at the SDAT Tennis Stadium in Chennai, India, from 2 January through 8 January 2017. It was the last edition of the Chennai Open before it moved to Pune, Maharashtra and was renamed the Maharashtra Open. Second-seeded Roberto Bautista Agut won the singles title.

Points and prize money

Point distribution

Prize money

Singles main-draw entrants

Seeds

1 Rankings as of 26 December 2016

Other entrants
The following players received wildcards into the singles main draw:
  Saketh Myneni
  Ramkumar Ramanathan
  Casper Ruud

The following players received entry from the qualifying draw:
  Yuki Bhambri
  Chung Hyeon
  Jozef Kovalík
  Nikola Mektić

Withdrawals
Before the tournament
  Tommy Robredo →replaced by  Aljaž Bedene

Doubles main-draw entrants

Seeds

1 Rankings as of 26 December 2016

Other entrants
The following pairs received wildcards into the doubles main draw:
  Sriram Balaji /  Vishnu Vardhan
  Saketh Myneni /  Ramkumar Ramanathan

Finals

Singles 

  Roberto Bautista Agut defeated  Daniil Medvedev, 6–3, 6–4

Doubles 

  Rohan Bopanna /  Jeevan Nedunchezhiyan defeated  Purav Raja  /  Divij Sharan, 6–3, 6–4

References

External links 
Official website

 
Maharashtra Open
Sports competitions in Chennai
Aircel Chennai Open